Davāzdah Rokh (Twelve combats) is a story in Shahnameh. This relatively long story (almost 2,500 verses) is described as one of the finest stories of Shahnameh in terms of "plot, dramatic description, and insight into human nature".

It takes place in the border of Iran and Turan, where a number of Iranian heroes fight with a number of Turanian heroes. In all cases, Iranian heroes defeat their Turanian competitors. Goudarz is the chief of Iranian heroes and Piran Viseh is the chief of Turanian heroes. The battle begins when Piran's brother, Houman, challenges the Iranians and is killed by Bizhan in a single combat. The two armies then fight together but the war has no winner. Finally they agree on pitched battles (mard o mard) between the heroes of the two army:

Heroes of the two army 
 Fariburz vs Golbad Viseh
 Giv vs Goruye Zereh
 Gorazeh vs Siamak the Turanian
 Foruhal vs Zangolah
 Rohham vs Barman
 Bizhan vs Rooyin
 Hojir vs Sepahram
 Zange-ye Shavaran vs Akhvast
 Gorgin vs Andariman
 Bartah vs Kohram
 Goudarz vs Piran
 Gostaham vs Lahhak and Farshad

In all battles, the winner is the Iranian hero. At the end, Goudarz kills Piran and the war ends. However, Gostaham, who has not been chosen by Kay Khosrow to fight with Turanians, chases Lahhāk and Faršēd, brothers of Piran, and kills them. However he himself was severely injured and Bizhan takes him to Kay Khosrow and the latter saves his life by tying a panacean bead around his arm. The war ends with the death of Afrasiab, Turan's king. In some manuscripts of Shahnameh the story is entitled az Yazdah Rokh (Eleven combats), not counting the last fight between Gostaham and Piran's brothers.

The war was ended with the victory of Iran and a festival was held on the honor of king Kai Khosrow and Goudarz chief army.

Location of Davazdah Rokh 
According to shahnameh the place of war was in the area near Zibad Castle or black mountain of Gonabad in Iran state of Greater Khorasan ..

Gallery

See also
Shahnameh of Shah Tahmasp

References

Sources
Ferdowsi university Simorgh Magazine,No 9 August 28, 2018 page 81-89 Location of Davazdah Rokh combats

External links
hamshahrionline: a festival in the place of Davazdah Rokh war 

Shahnameh stories